Young Daniel Boone is a 1950 American Cinecolor Western film directed by Reginald Le Borg and written by Clint Johnston and Reginald Le Borg. The film stars David Bruce, Kristine Miller, Damian O'Flynn, Don Beddoe, Mary Treen and John Mylong. The film was released on March 5, 1950, by Monogram Pictures.

Plot

Cast         
David Bruce as Daniel Boone
Kristine Miller as Rebecca Bryan
Damian O'Flynn as Capt. Fraser
Don Beddoe as Charlie Bryan
Mary Treen as Helen Bryan
John Mylong as Col. von Arnheim
William Roy Little Hawk
Stanley Logan as Col. Benson
Herbert Naish as Pvt. Haslet
Nipo T. Strongheart as Walking Eagle
Dick Foote as Lt. Perkins 
Stephen S. Harrison as Sentry

References

External links
 

1950 films
1950s English-language films
American Western (genre) films
1950 Western (genre) films
Monogram Pictures films
Films directed by Reginald Le Borg
French and Indian War films
Cinecolor films
1950s American films